Ellenbrook railway station was a railway station serving the Ellenbrook area of Worsley, Greater Manchester, England on the Tyldesley Loopline and Manchester and Wigan line.

References

External links
 The station on a 1948 OS map via npe maps
 The line and mileages via Railwaycodes

Disused railway stations in Salford
Former London and North Western Railway stations
Railway stations in Great Britain opened in 1864
Railway stations in Great Britain closed in 1961